Joshua James Hill (born May 21, 1990) is a former American football tight end. He played college football for Idaho State and was signed by the New Orleans Saints as an undrafted free agent in 2013. He played with the team through the 2020 season.

Professional career

New Orleans Saints
Hill signed with the New Orleans Saints after not being selected in the 2013 NFL Draft.

Hill became a restricted free agent during the 2016 offseason. On March 22, 2016, he signed an offer sheet to join the Chicago Bears. Three days later the Saints matched the Bears' offer sheet and re-signed Hill.

In Week 13 of the 2016 season against the Detroit Lions, Hill broke his fibula and was placed on injured reserve on December 9, 2016. He played in nine games with eight starts finishing the season with 15 receptions for 149 yards and a touchdown.

On December 31, 2018, Hill signed a three-year, $8.85 million contract extension with the Saints through the 2021 season.

On December 16, 2019, against the Indianapolis Colts on Monday Night Football, Hill caught a 5-yard touchdown, which ended up being quarterback Drew Brees' 540th regular-season touchdown pass, breaking Peyton Manning's previous mark of 539 during the 34–7 win.

On March 3, 2021, Hill was released by the Saints.

Detroit Lions
Hill signed with the Detroit Lions on March 13, 2021. He was placed on the reserve/retired list by the team on May 10, 2021.

NFL statistics

Regular season

Postseason

References

External links
 Idaho State Bengals bio
 New Orleans Saints bio

1990 births
Living people
American football tight ends
Boise State Broncos football players
Detroit Lions players
Idaho State Bengals football players
New Orleans Saints players
People from Blackfoot, Idaho
Players of American football from Idaho